The 1963 Bandy World Championship was the third Bandy World Championship and was contested between four men's bandy playing nations. The championship was played in Sweden from 20–24 February 1963. The Soviet Union became champions.

Results

References

1963
1963 in bandy
1963 in Swedish sport
International bandy competitions hosted by Sweden
February 1963 sports events in Europe